Norris Ellington McCleary (born May 10, 1977) is a former American football defensive tackle. He played for the Kansas City Chiefs from 2000 to 2001. He is a Defensive Line coach for Southern Durham High School

References

1977 births
Living people
American football defensive tackles
East Carolina Pirates football players
Kansas City Chiefs players
Frankfurt Galaxy players
Columbus Destroyers players
Dallas Desperados players
Players of American football from North Carolina
People from Shelby, North Carolina
People from Bessemer City, North Carolina